The Leamington Open Tournament also known as the Leamington Lawn Tennis Club Tournament founded on 1 August 1882 was a men's and women's grass court tennis tournament held at Leamington Spa, Warwickshire, England from  1882 to 1931 as part of the pre-open era tennis tour.

History
The Leamington Open Tournament were established on 1 August 1882, and first staged at Jephson Gardens. At the same meeting held in August 1882 a dual tournament was stage called the Warwickshire Championships (1882-1938).

At the inaugural event the first men's all comers singles champion was England's Robert Wallace Braddell, (son of Sir Thomas Braddell) defeated Edward Lake Williams in 3 straight sets. The all comers mixed doubles title was won by Erskine Gerald Watson and his sister Maud Watson.

This tournament continued seperatley to that of the county championship until 1931. Formers men's  winners of this event include Charles Walder Grinstead (1883) and Cotah Ramaswami (1920).

Finals

Mens Singles
Incomplete roll

Mix Doubles
Incomplete roll

References

Sources
 Nieuwland, Alex. "Tournament – Leamington. www.tennisarchives.com. A. Nieuwland.
 Routledges Sporting Annual (1883) George Routledge and Son. London.
 Warwickshire County Tennis Championships. Leamington Lawn Tennis & Squash Club". lltsc.co.uk.

Grass court tennis tournaments
Defunct tennis tournaments in the United Kingdom
Tennis tournaments in England